Blanchard's ghost or tree nymph (Idea blanchardii), is a butterfly in the family Nymphalidae., which was first described by Paul Marchal in 1845.

References

Butterflies described in 1845
Idea (butterfly)
Taxa named by Paul Marchal